A fjard is a large open space of water between groups of islands or mainland in archipelagos. Fjards can be found along sea coasts, in freshwater lakes or rivers. Fjard and fjord were originally the same word with the general meaning of sailable waterway. In Scandinavia, fjords dominate along the North Sea coast while fjards dominate the Baltic Sea coast.

Fjards vs. fjords vs. förden vs. rias
Although fjards and fjords are similar in that they are a glacially-formed topography, they still differ in some key ways:

 Fjords are characterized by steep high relief cliffs carved by glacial activity and often have split or branching channels.
 Fjards are a glacial depression or valley that has much lower relief than a fjord. Fjards fill with eroded local materials which assists "filling" along with rising sea level since the last ice age contributing as well. Other low relief landforms that are only associated with fjards such as mud flats, salt marshes, and flood plains further characterize the difference between fjords and fjards.
 "Förden" of the German coast and the fjords of Danish eastern Jutland together form a third type of glacial inlets. They tend to occur along older 'beheaded' river channels and open into the tideless Baltic sea.
 Rias are drowned valleys, such as the estuaries of Thames, Severn and Humber, firths of Tay and Forth.

Examples

Denmark 
 Hjortsholm on the coast of Denmark

Republic of Ireland 
 Killary Harbour on the west coast of Ireland

Sweden 
 Kanholmsfjärden in the Stockholm archipelago in Sweden

United Kingdom

Scotland 
 Cree, Kirkcudbrighshrie and Wigtownshire
 Firth of Clyde, Dunbartonshire
 Rough Firth, Kirkcudbrightshire
 Water of Fleet, Kirkcudbrightshire

Wales 
 Alaw Estuary, Anglesey
 Pwllheli Harbour, Caernarfonshire

United States 
 Somes Sound in Acadia National Park, Maine.

References

 
Coastal and oceanic landforms
Glacial landforms